Mohamed Boussaid ( – born 26 September 1961 Fes) is a Moroccan politician of the National Rally of Independents. Between 2007 and 2010, he held the position of Minister of Tourism and Crafts in the cabinet of Abbas El Fassi. Since 2010, he has been "Wali" (governor) of the Souss-Massa-Drâa region. He was Minister of Economy and Finance from October 2013 to August 2018.

See also
Cabinet of Morocco

References

Living people
Finance ministers of Morocco
Government ministers of Morocco
1961 births
People from Fez, Morocco
Moroccan engineers
National Rally of Independents politicians